Mount Fromme is one of the North Shore Mountains that overlook Burrard Inlet north of Vancouver, British Columbia. It stands just east of Grouse Mountain, and the District of North Vancouver and the City of North Vancouver lie on its lower slope where it descends to the inlet. Mount Fromme, like the other mountains of the Pacific Ranges, is covered with temperate rainforest of the Coastal Western Hemlock Zone. In the case of Mount Fromme this is largely secondary forest, since the mountain was extensively logged in the early 20th century. Outside of the Vancouver area Mount Fromme is known as a mountain biking destination.

Origin of the Name
Mount Fromme is named after J. M. Fromme (ca. 1858-1941), the "Father of Lynn Valley," a lumber camp foreman who built the first house in Lynn Valley, which drains the eastern slope of the mountain. This name, first proposed in 1928 when Fromme was reeve of the District of North Vancouver, became official on December 7, 1937. Prior to that, the mountain had been known as The Dome and, still earlier, as Timber Mountain.

Mountain Biking
Mount Fromme features various trails, many of which are part of the NSMBA (North Shore Mountain Biking Association). Some of these trails are sponsored by companies which provide money to maintain the trails. There is also a nudist club called Van Tan Nudist Club past the second switch back on mountain highway. Members of the club are given access to the location by vehicle which is usually blocked off by a gate.
Mount Fromme features green, blue, black, double black and "triple red" trails.

Mt. Fromme is a popular destination for many bikers during the summer. The trails are accessed via Mountain Highway, though bikers have to ride up as the gravel path is restricted to vehicle access with special privileges. The path eventually leads to Grouse Mountain. The easier trails are usually located at the bottom of the hill while the advanced ones are further up. The majority of the trails are located below the seventh switchback.

Notable Trails
There are approximately 40 mountain biking trails in total though many of them have become not ride-able due to lack of maintenance. Companies can sponsor trails to maintain them.
Bobsled
Bobsled is the most popular trail on Mount Fromme. It is past the first switchback a little further than Floppy Bunny. The trail is a very fast, smooth trail resembling a pump track that contains a lot of berms, bumps, and jumps. There are several ladder bridges and drops. The trail is rated a green/blue. The run is a green if none of the features are attempted but a blue if they are. 

Baden-Powell Trail
Though it is mainly a hiking trail, many mountain bike trails end at various points along the Baden Powell which bikers use to get back to Mountain Highway. It contains ladder bridges and several technical rock features. The Baden Powell is rated a blue trail.

38DD
38DD is a very advanced trail which is situated between the third and fourth switchback. It is most notable for the giant drop at the opening of the trail which launches off from a massive boulder. There is an alternate entrance that starts higher up on Mountain Highway. It is rated as a triple red diamond trail (the hardest difficulty) but is now decommissioned and is in disrepair.

Air Supply/Jerry Rig
Air Supply is a trail located on the sixth switchback after Oil Can. It is currently decommissioned and all the jumps which used to be on it are now destroyed. It used to contain massive jumps and drops, some of which still exist but are unsafe to ride. Air Supply branches onto the trail Jerry Rig (which is sometimes called Lower Air Supply). Jerry Rig officially starts further up Mountain Highway. It contains massive ladder bridges, many of which are over 10 feet in the air and under six inches thick, giant jumps and wall-rides, almost all of which are in disrepair and unsafe to ride. Both trails are triple red diamonds and deposit onto the Baden-Powell Trail.

The Flying Circus
The Flying Circus is a triple red diamond run constructed by North Shore biker "Dangerous Dan". It starts just below Upper Oil Can and is known for the extremely challenging skinnies and ladder-bridges which are very thin and high in the air. Some of the skinnies require the  rider to do a bunny hop to maneuver around the corners.

The Flying Circus is now decommissioned.

Floppy Bunny
Floppy Bunny is a popular trail found before Bobsled on the climb up. It is a black diamond but can be ridden as a blue if none of the optional features are attempted. It contains an optional jump line but several mandatory wood features.

Hiking
Mount Fromme also contains a few hiking trails. Some trails are shared biking and hiking trails. Some hiking-only trails include St. Georges which connects the Baden Powell Trail with Mountain Highway just before the seventh switchback, and Per Gynt which connects the seventh switchback to past the eighth.  The summit trail to Mount Fromme winds through second growth forest, gaining a final 350 meters of elevation.  The false summit of Mount Fromme has hiking trails that connect to Grouse Mountain and Goat Mountain.  The summit offers views of Cathedral Mountain, Mount Burwell, Mount Coliseum, Fannin Range, The Needles, Lynn Peak, Seymour Mountain, and Mount Baker.  The summit typically sees snowpack until mid to late June.

References

External links

 North Shore Mtn.Biking History
  "Fromme Mountain Trail Classification Study" decision
Mount Fromme is a worthwhile North Shore hike 
Overview of trails with links to trail descriptions and maps
Hiking to the summit of Mount Fromme

One-thousanders of British Columbia
North Vancouver (district municipality)
North Shore Mountains